Luis Gómez may refer to:

Luis Gómez (footballer) (born 1972), retired footballer from Ecuador
Luis Gómez (baseball) (born 1951), retired baseball player from Mexico
Luis Gómez (tennis) (born 1992), Panamanian tennis player
Luis Gómez-Montejano (1922–2017), president of Real Madrid
Luis Moises Gomez (c. 1660–1740), Sephardic Jewish merchant and trader
Luis Arce Gómez (born 1938), Bolivian military officer
Luis Eduardo Gómez (1941–2011), Colombian journalist
Luis Gómez Gómez (born 1980), Mexican politician
Luis Hernando Gómez (born 1958), Colombian drug trafficker